Rubicundus is a genus of hagfishes, the only member of the subfamily Rubicundinae. All species in it were formerly classified in Eptatretus. R. eos, R. lakeside, and R. rubicundus are known from single specimens caught in the Tasman Sea, Galápagos, and Taiwan, respectively. They are named after the distinctive red coloration that all species share. 

They are considered the most basal extant lineage of hagfishes, and may represent the sister group to the Cretaceous fossil hagfish Tethymyxine, from which they potentially diverged during the Late Jurassic or Early Cretaceous. Both the Rubicundinae and Tethymyxine share an elongate snout, indented barbels, and numerous slime glands.

Species
Four recognized species are placed in this genus:
 Rubicundus eos (Fernholm, 1991) (pink hagfish) 
 Rubicundus lakeside (Mincarone & J. E. McCosker, 2004) (Lakeside hagfish)
 Rubicundus lopheliae (Fernholm & Quattrini, 2008) 
 Rubicundus rubicundus (C. H. Kuo, S. C. Lee & H. K. Mok, 2010)

References

Myxinidae
Jawless fish genera